Milović is a patronymic surname derived from a masculine given name Milo. It may refer to:

Goran Milović (born 1989), footballer
Milovan Milović (born 1980), footballer 
Zoran Milović (born 1977), basketball player
Željko Milović (born 1968), writer

Serbian surnames
Patronymic surnames